During the Middle Ages, magic took on many forms, Instead of being able to identify one type of magic user, there were many who practiced several types of magic in these times, including monks, priests, physicians, surgeons, midwives, folk healers, and diviners. The practice of “magic” often consisted of using medicinal herbs for healing purposes. Classical medicine entailed magical elements. They would use charms or potions in hopes of driving out a sickness. People had strongly differing opinions as to what magic was, and because of this, it is important to understand all aspects of magic at this time.

Medieval magic

Medical magic 
Medical care in the Middle Ages was extremely broad and took many different forms. Practices like therapy revolved around plants, animals, and minerals at this time. Medicinal practices in the Middle Ages were often regarded as herbalism. One example of a book that gave recipes and descriptions of plants, animals, and minerals was referred to as a “leechbook”, or a doctor-book that included Masses to be said to bless the healing herbs. There were over 400 herbs and plants recorded in different medical books produced during this time. For example, a procedure for curing skin disease first involves an ordinary herbal medicine followed by strict instructions to draw blood from the neck of the ill, pour it into running water, spit three times and recite a sort of spell to complete the cure. In addition to the leechbook, the Lacnunga included many prescriptions derived from the European folk culture. The Lacnunga prescribed a set of Christian prayers to be said over the ingredients used to make the medicine, and such ingredients were to be mixed by straws with the names “Matthew, Mark, Luke, and John” inscribed on them. In order for the cure to work, several charms had to be sung in Latin over the medicine. Books like the "leechbook" and the Lacnunga were essentially recipe books that contained details on what each recipe could be used for and it gave detailed descriptions of the plants that were used for healing. Each book contained different content, because popular belief was always changing.

Astrology 
Astrology in its rudimentary form was categorized under spirituality. However, many of the subsections under medieval magic relied on the contextual information within astrology in order to be effective. People who practiced magic often relied on the influence of astrological power for their practices. The presence of astrology in the Middle Ages is recorded on the walls of the San Miniato al Monte basilica in Florence, Italy. The art on the walls of the basilica depict all of the zodiac symbols. Each of the zodiac during this era were connected with a specific part of the human body that it was deeply connected to. People who practice magic during this period could take the zodiac into consideration of the practices more precisely if it were directly related to body parts.

Divination 
Divination in the Middle Ages can be used as a broad term to define practices used to understand or foresee one's fate and to connect with the entities that brought about said fate. There were multiple ways by which people could attempt divination. Tarot cards were present during the Middle Ages, but it is not clear how the cards were used and interpreted during this period. However, the general placement of the cards would have affected the interpretation of the message.

Charms
Prayers, blessings, and adjurations were all common forms of verbal formulas whose intentions were hard to distinguish between the magical and the religious. In the Christian context, prayers were typically requests directed to a holy figure such as God, a saint, Christ, or Mary. Blessings more often were addressed to patients, and came in the form of wishes for good fortune. Adjurations, which is defined as the process of making an oath, are also used as exorcisms were more directed to either a sickness, or the agent responsible such as a worm, ghost, demon, or fairy of a mischievous or malevolent nature.  While these three verbal formulas may have had religious intentions, they often played a role in magical practices. Blessings were more often than not strictly religious as well, unless they were used alongside magic or in a magical context. However, adjurations required closer scrutiny, as their formulas were generally derived from folklore. Though people at this age were less concerned with whether or not these verbal formulas involved magic or not, but rather with the reality of if they were or were not successful, because they were used to heal.

In addition to the Christian base of charms, tangible items were incorporated into the magical practice. Such items included amulets, talismans, gemstones, as well as smaller items that were used to create the amulets. These items were convenient because they could be kept on one's person at all times, and they served many purposes. They could protect the user from multiple forms of danger, bring the user good fortune, or they could combine multiple blessings and protections depending on how the charm user interacted with them.

Sorcery 
Not only was it difficult to make the distinction between the magical and religious, but what was even more challenging was to distinguish between helpful (white) magic from harmful (black) magic. Medical magic and protective magic were regarded as helpful, and called ‘white’, while sorcery was considered evil and ‘black’. Distinguishing between black magic and white magic often relied on perspective, for example, if a healer attempted to cure a patient and failed, some would accuse the healer of intentionally harming the patient. In this era, magic was only punished if it was deemed to be ‘black’, meaning it was the practice of a sorcerer with harmful intention.

Opposition

Early opposition 
Views on magic changed throughout the years and as time went on more controls were placed on magic, these controls varied from place to place and also depended on social status. One of the main reasons magic was condemned was because those who practiced it put themselves at risk of physical and spiritual assault from the demons they sought to control. However, the overarching concern of magical practices was the grievous harm it could do to others. Magic represented a huge threat to an age that widely professed belief in religion and holy powers.

Legal prohibitions 
Legislation against magic could be one of two types, either by secular authorities or by the Church. The penalties assigned by secular law typically included execution, but were more severe based on the impact of the magic, as people were less concerned with the means of magic, and more concerned with its effects on others. The penalties by the Church often required penance for, what they viewed as the sin of magic, or in harsher cases could excommunicate the accused under the circumstances that the work of magic was a direct offense against God. The distinction between these punishments, secular versus the Church, were not absolute as many of the laws enacted by both parties were derived from the other.

The persecution of magic can be seen in law codes dating back to the 6th century, where the Germanic code of Visigoths condemned sorcerers who cursed the crops and animals of peasant's enemies. In terms of secular legislation, Charles the Great (Charlemagne) was arguably the strongest opposing force to magic. He declared that all who practiced sorcery or divination would become slaves to the Church, and all those who sacrificed to the Devil or Germanic gods would be executed.

Charlemagne's objection to magic carried over into later years, as many rulers built on his early prohibitions. King Roger II of Sicily punished the use of poisons by death, whether natural or magical. Additionally, he proclaimed that ‘love magic’ be punished regardless of if anyone was hurt or not. However, secular rulers were still more concerned with the actual damage of the magic rather than the means of its infliction.

Instructions issued in 800 at a synod in Freising provide general outlines for ecclesiastical hearings. The document states that those accused of some type of sorcery were to be examined by the archpriest of the diocese in hopes of prompting a confession. Torture was used if necessary, and the accused were often sentenced to prison until they resolved to do penance for their sins.

Prosecution in the Early Middle Ages 
More cases of witches being prosecuted began between 1430 and 1530. However, prosecution for witchcraft was not a common practice until the later 1500s. The modern witch obsession took thousands of lives. These trials focused on those who were accused of practicing dangerous witchcraft, In Switzerland and surrounding areas those accusing and prosecuting these witches did so out of fear that they were worshiping the devil. Cases like these were more common in Catholic cities, for example Lucerne and Nuremberg. Important political figures were the most frequently known characters in trials against magic, whether defendants, accusers, or victims. This was because high-society trials were more likely to be recorded as opposed to trials involving ordinary townspeople or villagers. For example, Gregory of Tours recorded the accusations of magic at the royal court of 6th century Gaul. According to History of the Franks, two people were executed for supposedly bewitching emperor Arnulf and prompting the stroke that led to his death. Prosecution of magic was infrequent during this era because Christians were willing to adapt magic practices within the context of religion. For example, astrology was created by the Greeks, who were considered to be pagans by Medieval Christians. Astrology was condemned if it were used to control destiny because the Christian God is supposed to be the one who controls destiny. Early Christians were accommodating of astrology as long as it was connected to the physical realm as opposed to the spiritual. Another example, Dame Alice Kyteler was accused of witchcraft and demonology following the suspicious deaths of three of her husbands. She was excommunicated, but escaped severe punishments due to her high rank and social connections. Knowledge of witchcraft was so limited to the accusers that they labelled what was likely dildo lube as a potential accessory of her demonic misdeeds.

In the Later Middle Ages 
The concept of magic was further developed in the high and late Middle Ages. The rise of legal commentaries and consultations during this time lead to the inclusion of law in Universities’ curricula. This fueled a detailed reflection of the principles underlying prosecution for magic. The early fourteenth century brought about the pinnacle of trials involving magic. In this time, several individuals were charged with using magic against both Pope John XXII and the King of France. These trials only enhanced the already growing concern about magic, and thus perpetuated the increasing severity of punishments for such actions. The increase in trials in the late Middle Ages was also in part due to the shift from accusatory to inquisitorial procedures. In accusatory procedures, the accuser had to provide ample evidence to prove the guilt of the accused. If the accuser failed to do so, or did not have any proof, he or she would have to face the punishment that would have been assigned to the accused had he/she been found guilty. The inquisitorial procedure allowed judges to undertake prosecution on their own initiative without consequences. This made it easier for the accuser to secure conviction for sorcery, and not have to worry about having insufficient evidence thus putting their own innocence in jeopardy. Inquisitorial interrogation took many forms, including experiments with reflecting surfaces, invocation of demons, use of human heads to obtain love or hatred, and more.

Another possible reason for the rise in frequency of trials regarding magic in the later fourteenth century was due to a change from parchment to a cheaper medium of paper. This made it cheaper for more information to be recorded and preserved, therefore we have a greater volume of documented information from this era. While this may have caused a slight increase in trials against magic, the main reason was in fact the new inquisitorial procedure of trial and prosecution as mentioned above.

Rise of witch trials 

The rise of witch trials is brought about by changes in religion as well as changes to the political world in Europe showing once again how different topics had an influence on witchcraft.The fourteenth century already brought about an increase of sorcery trials, however the second and third quarters of the fifteenth century were known for the most dramatic uprising of trials involving witchcraft. The trials developed into catch-all prosecution, in which townspeople were encouraged to seek out as many suspects as possible. The goal was no longer to secure justice against a single offender but rather to purge the community of all transgressors. The term “witchcraft” has multiple connotations, all involving some type of sorcery or magic. However, by the late Middle Ages this term developed into someone who went beyond mere sorcery and acted in league with other witches on behalf of the Devil. Friars preached that not only are the witches who work for the devil guilty, but also all those who fail to report these culprits. This led to an outbreak of accusations, in fear of being accused themselves. Trials inspired more trials, and this increase in trials inspired the rise in the frequency of literature on witches. The famed culmination of this literary tradition was the Malleus Maleficarum written in 1486 by Jacob Sprenger and Henry Kramer. This classic case of misogynist witchcraft treatise and its impact on magic in the Middle Ages will be explored later in this article. The growing popularity of literature regarding witchcraft and magic lead to an even greater upsurge in trials and prosecutions of witches.

The stereotype of the witch finally solidified in the late Middle Ages. Numerous texts singled out women to be especially inclined to witchcraft. In the fourteenth and fifteenth centuries, women defendants outnumbered men two to one. This difference only became more pronounced in the following centuries. The disparity between women and men defendants was primarily due to the position women held in late medieval society. Women in this era were far less trusted than men, as they were thought to be weak minded and easily dissuaded. General misogynist stereotypes further encouraged their prosecution, which lead to a more stiffened stereotype of witches. Massive witch trials swept across Europe in the second half of the fifteenth century. In 1428, more than 100 people were burned for killing others, destroying crops, and working harm by means of magic. This trial in the Valais provided the first evidence for the fully developed stereotype of a witch, including flight through the air, transforming humans into animals, eating babies and the veneration of the Devil. The unrestricted use of torture in combination with the adoption of inquisitorial procedures as well as the development of the witch stereotype and a dramatic rise in public suspicion ultimately caused the swelling fervor and frequency of these sweeping witch hunts.

Malleus Maleficarum 
Practices such as medicinal magic, charms, and sorcery have been dated back centuries before they were considered evil, but it was not until Malleus Maleficarum was published in 1487 that individuals who practiced things considered as “witchcraft” were punished severely. Malleus Maleficarum was published by a Catholic clergyman in Germany. It was written in Latin and the title roughly translates to “Hammer of the Witches”. Before the publication of Malleus Maleficarum, an individual was barely punished if accused of practicing any form of magic. This document changed the way that medieval society treated anyone who performed anything considered an act of magic or witchcraft.  Malleus Maleficarum was used as a judicial book of guidelines within secular courts of Europe over three hundred years after its date of publication. Its main two purposes were to inform the audience about how to detect individuals who practice magic and how to prosecute said individuals. The document was divided into three parts, each of which dealt with something different within the process of persecution. The first section discusses what makes witchcraft real and how it was a very present threat to their current society. This section also makes the connection between witches and the Devil. In the second part, actual acts of magic are discussed.  Chapters within this section are titled with various spells that the witches might perform, such as “How they are transported from Place to Place”, “How Witches Impede and Prevent the Power of Procreation”, “Of the Manner whereby they Change Men into the Shapes of Beasts”, etc. They identify various magical practices with the idea of witchcraft, thus condemning many acts of magic that have been performed for centuries as crimes punishable by death. This section also discusses various remedies by which one can protect themselves against the actions of witches, many of these remedies being reminiscent of various magical acts. The third section discusses the actual prosecution of witches, and the procedure by which one must follow. It defines the use of prosecution, defense, witnesses, and punishments. It is essentially a guide on how to convict an individual of witchcraft.

Magic and Christianity 
Witchcraft and magic has connections to many other topics in the Middle Ages, making it a very important and influential topic. It has a large connection to religion due to the fact that Christianity had a major impact on those who practiced magic. When Christianity became more strict it viewed witches as atheists, in turn prosecuting them for it. Christianity and Catholicism grew with movements like the Spanish Reconquista, which ended in 1492 when Spain conquered Granada. This movement was a crusade and those involved forced others to convert to Christianity.

Women in magic 
During the Middle Ages around 60,000 people died during the early modern witch hunts, and as many as 70 percent of these people were women. Men began to see illiterate women as beings who held the power of sorcery, and witchcraft began to be viewed as satanic. The reason witches were mainly seen as women can be traced back to the Germanic legend of the Alpine witch, which stated that the details of demonology were strictly female. Women in medicine held titles such as healers and midwives, which had connections to witchcraft. With changes in the church came changes in the role of women, which influenced these prosecutions.

See also
Ceremonial magic
Renaissance magic

References

Medieval society
Magic (supernatural)
Medieval legends
Western esotericism